Morgan County Airport  is a public use airport in Morgan County, Ohio, United States. It is owned by the Morgan County Airport Authority and located three nautical miles (6 km) east of the central business district of McConnelsville, Ohio.

Facilities and aircraft 
Morgan County Airport covers an area of 123 acres (50 ha) at an elevation of 1,000 feet (305 m) above mean sea level. It has one runway designated 12/30 with an asphalt surface measuring 3,500 by 65 feet (1,067 x 20 m).

For the 12-month period ending June 15, 2009, the airport had 5,625 aircraft operations, an average of 15 per day: 97.8% general aviation, 1.8% air taxi, and 0.4% military. At that time there were five aircraft based at this airport: 80% single-engine and 20% helicopter.

References

External links 
 Aerial image as of April 1994 from USGS The National Map

Airports in Ohio
Transportation in Morgan County, Ohio